The Dean of Limerick and Ardfert is based in the Cathedral Church of St Mary's in Limerick in the united diocese of Limerick, Killaloe and Ardfert within the Church of Ireland. St Brendan's Cathedral, Ardfert was destroyed by fire in 1641.

The current incumbent is The Very Reverend Niall Sloane.

List of deans of Limerick

1588–1603 Denis Campbell (appointed Bishop of Derry, Raphoe and Clogher but died before consecration in 1603) 
1603–1635 George Andrew (afterwards Bishop of Ferns and Leighlin 1635) 
1635–1635 Michael Wandesford (afterwards Dean of Derry 1635) 
1635 Henry Sutton 
1640 Robert Naylor 
1661–1666 Richard Boyle (afterwards Bishop of Ferns and Leighlin 1666) 
1666–1679 John Smith (afterwards Bishop of Killala and Achonry 1679) 
1679 Thomas Hynde 
1692–1704 Ezechiel Webbe 
1704 George Water Story 
1721 Thomas Bindon 
1740–1766 Charles Massy 
1766–1771 John Averell (afterwards Bishop of Limerick, Ardfert and Aghadoe 1771) 
1771–1809 Maurice Crosbie 
1809–1844 Arthur John Preston 
1844-1849 William Higgin (afterwards Bishop of Limerick, Ardfert and Aghadoe 1849) 
1849–1868 Anthony Kirwan
1868–1872 Maurice Day (afterwards Bishop of Cashel and Waterford 1872) 
1872–1899 Thomas Bunbury (afterwards Bishop of Limerick, Ardfert and Aghadoe 1849) 
1899–1905 James Gregg
1905–1913 Lucius O'Brien
1913–1928 Aylmer Hackett
1929–1953 George Swain
1954–1971 Maurice Talbot
1971–1981 Walton Empey (afterwards Bishop of Limerick and Killaloe, 1981)
1981-1986 George Chambers
See below for Deans of Limerick and Ardfert

Deans of Ardfert

1603–1603 Richard Southwell
1603 Robert Chaffe
1619/20-1628 William Steere (afterwards Bishop of Ardfert and Aghadoe 1628)
1630 Charles Baden
1635 Thomas Gray
1661 Daniel Witter (afterwards Dean of Down and later Bishop of Killaloe 1669) 
1664 Thomas Bladen
1686 John Richards
1727/8 James Bland
1728 William Smyth (Archdeacon of Meath, 1730)
1732–1747 Charles Meredyth, son of Thomas Meredyth of Newtown, co. Meath
1747–1766 Sir Philip Hoby, 5th Baronet
1766–1772 Edward Bayly (afterwards Archdeacon of Dublin, 1772)
1785–1802 Thomas Graves (afterwards Dean of Connor, 1802)
1802–1842 Gilbert Holmes
1847–1861 Arthur Irwin
1861–1879 John Godfrey Day (died 1878)
1879–1894 Thomas Moriarty
1895–1906 Abraham Isaac
1906–1911 James MacEwan 
1911–1917 Robert Beatty
1918–1924 George Power
1924–1946 Robert Rowan
1947–1959 Charles Haines
1959–1966 Robert Thompson
1966–1985 Charles Gray-Stack

Deans of Limerick and Ardfert 
1987–2011 Maurice Sirr
2012–2017 Sandra Pragnell
2017–current Niall Sloane

References

 
 
 
Diocese of Limerick and Killaloe
Limerick and Ardfert